The Central Pori Church is a church in Gothic Revival style in the centre of the city of Pori, Western Finland. It is the largest church in region of Satakunta, and one of the largest in Finland. The church is also the main church of Pori.

The church was built in between 1859 and 1863, when it was inaugurated. It is known for its unique church tower, which is made of cast iron. The church was designed by C. T. von Chiewitz and C.J. von Heideken. Glass paintings in the church are made by Magnus Enckell.

Today the Central Pori Church is famous of its pipe organ, built by Paschen Kiel Orgelbau in 2007. The church is also the main concert venue of the annual Pori Organ festival.

References

External links 

Lutheran churches in Finland
Buildings and structures in Pori
Tourist attractions in Satakunta